Vale Community Hospital is a community hospital in Lister Road, Dursley, Gloucestershire, England. It is managed by Gloucestershire Health and Care NHS Foundation Trust.

History
The hospital was commissioned to replace the aging Berkeley Hospital and the Sandpits clinic. The site selected formed part of a large derelict area which had been occupied by Lister engine company and its successor, Lister Petter, and was subsequently developed by Stroud District Council for residential and industrial use. The new hospital, which was built at a cost of £10 million, was opened by the Anne, Princess Royal in February 2012.

References

NHS hospitals in England
Dursley
Hospitals in Gloucestershire
Hospital buildings completed in 2012
Hospitals established in 2012
2012 establishments in England